Frank Óscar Weaver Vasconcelos (born in 1981), known professionally as Frank Weaver, is a Paraguayan-American filmmaker, indigenous and environmental activist.

He is best known for writing and directing the Solar Map Project, an upcoming documentary film about ancient petroglyphs in the Amabay hills of Paraguay, and a host of Indigenous Earth Community Podcast.

Career

Weaver is a crowdfunding consultant and multimedia editor for National Geographic's Out of Eden Walk since 2015. His editing work includes a series of Micro Stories that take place in remote regions of India and Pakistan.

Weaver employs film-making, online platforms, and direct action to advocate for a variety of social issues. These include indigenous rights in Paraguay, rock art conservation, and environmental protection. In 2010 one of his water conservation films won "Planet Inspired", a National Geographic and The North Face video contest designed to inspire people to care about the planet.

His latest film "The New Gatherers" hopes to inspire people to prevent 8 million metric tons of plastic that enter our world’s oceans each year by collecting it, one piece at a time.

Early life

Frank Weaver was born in Pedro Juan Caballero, Paraguay, the son of Sonia Weaver (née Vasconcelos) a nurse, and Joseph Weaver, a writer and entrepreneur. Raised in the midst of the Stroessner military dictatorship, he credits his experiences with totalitarian rule with educating him in the power of images, a story he published in National Geographic.
 
As a youth, Weaver often visited the reservations of the Panambi'y Indians with his father, then a member of the Association for the Protection of the Environment (APMA), in order to participate in reforestation and environmental education projects.

Impressed with the work of the APMA, a Japanese businessman donated a video camera and other equipment to the organization. Weaver, being only 10 years old at the time, was selected to be the unofficial videographer for the organization's efforts, as his youth afforded him the time and acuity to learn the equipment. Throughout his visits to the reservations, Weaver undertook audiovisual documentation of the Guarani culture, and highlighted a variety of social issues faced by the community.

Environmental activism 

In 2009 Weaver traveled to Paraguay with Good Karma for All, a community organization he created to provide fun opportunities to volunteer and help people in need, to install the first latrines and solar lighting in a local indigenous community.

Weaver started participating and leading kayak clean ups in Central Florida since 2010, and was determined to continue the work since he found a dead soft shell turtle that died because it got tangled on a shirt.  Volunteers have removed tons and tons of litter from the waterways of Orlando. 

Weaver was part of a coalition that spoke to the Orlando city council and mayor to ban styrofoam from the city.
Since 2016 Weaver has been the Eco Captain of Central Florida Recon, an organization that aims to make environmental protection into an outdoor adventure. The group encourages people to lessen their impact on the planet by taking kayaking trips to local rivers and lakes to see pollution firsthand. They provide volunteers with the tools to remove litter, as well as education about reducing their trash at home. Recon of Central Florida was nominated by Orlando Weekly as one of the best activist groups in Orlando. 

His activism has been featured on Univision, helping to take his environmental message to Florida's Spanish speaking community.

Indigenous activism
At the age of 24, after many years of visiting a Pai Tavytera tribe, Weaver was initiated into the Panambi'y tribe with a lip piercing ritual by Shaman and community leader, Galeano Suarez, who said "Frank is one of us. He was initiated in a ceremony to make him a member of our tribe. I ask all people to support his work as he takes our plight to the world."

Weaver is a mentor to UNITY's Earth Ambassadors, a group of native youth who are involved in better their community by creating environmental projects.

National Museum of the American Indian – Smithsonian 
In 2017 Weaver was able to organize with Guarani Elders and the Smithsonian Museum to procure and place an authentic Pai Tavytera in the National Museum of the American Indian.

Indigenous Earth Community Podcast 
Weaver is the host of a weekly podcast called "Indigenous Earth Community Podcast" where he interviews activists, conservationists, and other leaders from indigenous communities around the world as they share ways in which ancestral traditions can save the planet. Past guest have included a Navajo Activist, a Cherokee Educator, an Uganda Eco Warrior, an Indonesia Conservationist and a Mexican Reforestation Leader.

Weaver released Guarani Music and images on a Creative Commons license to make available for people all over the world to experience the authentic culture of the Pai Tavytera.

Personal life

Weaver lives in Orlando, Florida, with his wife Jenelle Weaver (née Haas) and their two dogs. Outside of his interests in film-making, Weaver has also likes teaching people how to unlock their creativity.

Living just a few blocks from Pulse nightclub during the time of the 2016 mass shooting, Weaver was inspired to create a short film based on his experiences in the neighborhood following the attack, as well as the unexpected triggering effects the event had on his PTSD.

Awards and honors
Frank won "Planet Inspired", a National Geographic and The North Face video competition designed to inspire people to care about the planet.

Solar Map Project
Solar Map Project is an upcoming documentary about ancient rock art in Paraguay, and the culture of its guardians, the Pai Tavytera Indians. The goal of the film is to tell an informative, entertaining, and compelling story that explores the culture of a remote community of people and examine the potential threats facing the rock art they protect.  

Weaver and his documentary team used 3-D image to quickly digitize generations-old rock carvings before they were lost.

The documentary is currently in post-production, and upon completion it will be made freely available online under a Creative Commons license.

Filmography

 "Water Conservation Starts at Home" (2010)
 "War Paint" (2011)
 "5 steps to change the WORLD!" (2012)
 Ura – PTSD after Pulse (2017) 
 "The New Gatherers" 2019 
 "How to find peace during a global pandemic" (2020)
 Solar Map Project (TBD)

Notes 
 Weaver is a proponent of releasing works under a Creative Commons license whenever possible. This is to ensure other creators, citizen scientists, and professionals in various scientific fields will have access to his content in perpetuity.

References

External links 
 Shower Thoughts Twitter Bot
 The Solar Map Project
 YouTube Channel
 Interview with Frank Weaver and other Climate Activists

American filmmakers
1981 births
Living people